The House at 13 Sheffield Road in Wakefield, Massachusetts is a well-preserved Craftman/Bungalow style house.  The -story house was built c. 1918 out of fieldstone with a stucco exterior.  The roof has extended eaves with exposed purlins, and a large cross-gable section on the right side.  Strapwork on the walls give the house a Tudor Revival appearance.  The subdivision in which it was built was laid out in 1916 in an area known as Cowdrey's Hill, after an early settler.

The house was listed on the National Register of Historic Places in 1989.

See also
National Register of Historic Places listings in Wakefield, Massachusetts
National Register of Historic Places listings in Middlesex County, Massachusetts

References

Houses on the National Register of Historic Places in Wakefield, Massachusetts
Houses completed in 1918
Houses in Wakefield, Massachusetts